Lady M may refer to:
Lady M (boutique), a luxury confections brand
Lady M (yacht), a super-yacht
A Blonde Redhead song on the Barragán (album)